High Rhulain is a children's fantasy novel by Brian Jacques, published in 2005. It is the 18th book in the Redwall series.

Plot summary
The novel begins with Riggu Felis, wildcat warlord of Green Isle, and his two sons, Jeefra and Pitru, attempting to kill an osprey, later known to be Pandion Piketalon. Riggu scorns his sons' attempts to kill the osprey and jumps into the fray himself, attempting to scare it into submission. The osprey is not intimidated and sinks his talons into the cat's face, flying into the air with him. The wildcat drops to the ground with half of his face torn off. Because of this incident, the wildcat orders all birds on Green Isle to be slain.

Tiria Wildlough is daughter of Banjon Wildlough, the Skipper of Otters at Redwall Abbey. One afternoon, she and a few friends go out into Mossflower Woods to gather some wood, and along the way they run into some trouble in the form of a small but ferocious vermin band terrorizing Pandion. Tiria and her friends manage to fight them off, but the vermin swear revenge.

 When Tiria returns to Redwall, she and her father have a discussion, where Tiria learns that otter law allows only male otters to be Skippers. This upsets Tiria greatly, and she is quick to listen when Martin the Warrior and High Queen Rhulain Wildlough appear to her in a dream, telling her the otters of Green Isle need her assistance and leadership. After deciphering and scouring the Abbey for many clues with Old Quelt, Sister Snowdrop, Abbess Lycian, Brinty, Tribsy, and Girry, Tiria learns through another dream that she has to leave on her own, so she heads to Log-a-Log Urfa's encampment along with her father and Brink Greyspoke. Soon after, Brinty is killed when the aforementioned vermin band attacks Redwall, seeking vengeance.

At the same time, a rogue otter named Leatho Shellhound leads the free otter clans in various attacks against the ruling wildcats in an attempt to free their enslaved friends. Many famous otter clans take part, including Galedeep (related to Finnbarr Galedeep of The Bellmaker), Streambattle (related to Rab of The Bellmaker), and Wavedog (related to Kroova of Triss). However, Finnbarr and Kroova were sea otters, and Finnbarr had no known living kin.

Log-a-Log Urfa takes Tiria to Cuthbert Blanedale Frunk, a Long Patrol hare in the service of Lord Mandoral Highpeak at Salamandastron, where she receives a sling from the Badger Lord made of shark skin and the breastplate of the High Rhulain. Along with the a number of hares of the Long Patrol, Tiria sails to Green Isle in Frunk's ship, the Purloined Petunia, and they meet up with Shellhound and his otter clans.

At the abbey, the Redwallers continue to solve riddles from Sister Geminya, finding Corriam Wildlough's lance and the High Rhulain's coronet. Brantalis Skyfurrow, a visiting goose, flies the crown to Tiria at Green Isle.

When Tiria reaches Green Isle, she finds the otter clans in a stand-off with Riggu. Leatho Shellhound is trapped in a burning tower, set afire by Riggu's mate, Lady Kaltag, who lost her mind after the loss of her son, Jeefra. The birds Pandion and Brantalis save Leatho, but Riggu shortly after slays Pandion, who had previously ripped off part of his face, forcing him to wear a mask. Tiria, seeing Pandion killed, hurls the barbed star that first injured Pandion at Riggu, and with amazing accuracy, she strikes and kills Riggu Felis.

Meanwhile, Riggu's other son Pitru had taken some forces and led them out of the burning fortress. Pitru establishes himself as the new warlord among the wildcats. Knowing the otters will now return to where their families are hiding, Pitru builds a barricade square in the route that the otter clans have to take in order to rejoin their families. With the help of newly freed Leatho Shellhound, Lorgo Galedeep, Kolun Galedeep, and Banya Streamdog, Tiria routes the remaining vermin forces. Sadly, however, Cuthbert dies bringing down a Nessie-type monster Slothunog, and Pitru with him. Recovering from this loss, Tiria is later proclaimed by all as the new High Rhulain of Green Isle.

Characters in High Rhulain

Tiria Wildlough
Banjon Wildlough
Old Quelt
Sister Snowdrop
Abbess Lycian
Brinty
Tribsy
Girry
Log-a-Log Urfa
Brink Greyspoke
Weilmark Scaut
Riggu Felis
His sons: Jeefra and Pitru
His wife: Lady Kaltag
Atunra
Pandion Piketalon
Brantalis Skyfurrow
Scorecat Yund
Otter Warriors:
Leatho Shellhound
Lorgo Galedeep
Kolun Galedeep
Banya Streamdog
Runka Streamdog
Whulky Wildlough
Chab Wildlough
Roggan Streamdiver
Scorecat Yund
Other Otters on Green Isle
Memsy
Deedero Galedeep
Birl Gully
Ould Zillo the Bard
Cuthbert Blanedale Frunk
Lord Mandoral Highpeak

Reviews
Anita Burkham of Horn Book said that Jacques' "trademark blend of folksy good humor and high-spirited action," and High Rhulain character's exhibits a "joie de vivre that earns them the loyalty of their many fans."

Book divisions (English) 
Book 1: The Forgotten Tome
Book 2: The Fool of the Sea
Book 3: Across the Western Sea

Translations
(French) Rougemuraille
(Russian) Остров королевы

References 

Fictional otters
Children's fantasy novels
Redwall books
2005 British novels
2005 children's books
2005 fantasy novels
Puffin Books books